Arthur Frederick Smith (13 May 1853 – 18 January 1936) was an English first-class cricketer active 1873–78 who played for Middlesex. He played in 14 first-class matches as a right-handed batsman, scoring 193 runs with a highest score of 48*.

Smith was born in Regent's Park, London, and educated at Harrow School, Wellington College and Trinity College, Cambridge, where he was awarded blues for both cricket and rugby. He moved to South Africa and worked for the mining company De Beers. He died at Kimberley, Cape Province.

References

1853 births
1936 deaths
English cricketers
Middlesex cricketers
Cambridge University cricketers
Marylebone Cricket Club cricketers
Non-international England cricketers
Gentlemen of England cricketers
People educated at Harrow School
People educated at Wellington College, Berkshire
Alumni of Trinity College, Cambridge